Falls of the Braan is a waterfall of Scotland located in the Hermitage at the National Trust for Scotland-protected site in Dunkeld, Perth and Kinross.

See also
Waterfalls of Scotland

References

Waterfalls of Scotland